Ekelöf Point is a high rocky point which lies  southwest of Cape Gage and marks the north side of the entrance to Markham Bay on the east side of James Ross Island. It was first seen and surveyed by the Swedish Antarctic Expedition under Otto Nordenskiöld, 1901–04, who named it "Kap Ekelof" after Dr. Eric Ekelof, the medical officer of the expedition. It was resurveyed by Falkland Islands Dependencies Survey in 1953. Point is considered a more suitable descriptive term for this feature than cape.

References 

Headlands of James Ross Island